Live over Europe 2007 is the sixth live album by British band Genesis.  It was recorded during the Turn It On Again: The Tour of 2007. It was released in North America by Atlantic Records on 20 November 2007, and in Europe by Virgin Records on 26 November 2007 and serves as the companion to the When in Rome 2007 DVD.

Track listing

Disc 1
 "Duke's Intro" (Behind the Lines/Duke's End) – 3:48
 "Turn It On Again" – 4:26
 "No Son of Mine" – 6:57
 "Land of Confusion" – 5:11
 "In the Cage"/"The Cinema Show"/"Duke's Travels" – 13:30
 "Afterglow" – 4:27
 "Hold on My Heart" – 5:58
 "Home by the Sea/Second Home by the Sea" – 11:58
 "Follow You Follow Me" – 4:19
 "Firth of Fifth" [excerpt] – 4:39
 "I Know What I Like (In Your Wardrobe)" – 6:45

Disc 2
 "Mama" – 6:57
 "Ripples..." – 7:57
 "Throwing It All Away" – 6:01
 "Domino" – 11:34
 "Conversations with 2 Stools" – 6:48
 "Los Endos" – 6:24
 "Tonight, Tonight, Tonight" [excerpt] – 3:49
 "Invisible Touch" – 5:35
 "I Can't Dance" – 6:11
 "The Carpet Crawlers" – 6:00

Personnel
Phil Collins – lead vocals, drums, percussion, stool
Mike Rutherford – 6 and 12-string guitars, bass, bass pedals, backing vocals
Tony Banks – keyboards, backing vocals

with

Daryl Stuermer – guitars, bass, bass pedals, backing vocals
Chester Thompson – drums, percussion, stool

Charts and certifications

Weekly charts

Year-end charts

Certifications

See also
The Turn It On Again Reunion Tour
"When in Rome 2007"

References

External links
 Genesis Website

Albums produced by Nick Davis (record producer)
Genesis (band) live albums
2007 live albums
Atlantic Records live albums
Virgin Records live albums